Stewart McDonald may refer to:

Stewart McDonald (water skier) (1925–2008)
Stewart McDonald (politician) (born 1986), Scottish MP for Glasgow South

See also
Stuart McDonald (disambiguation)
Stewart MacDonald (born 1967), Scottish Labour Party local government councillor